Aqua Teen Hunger Force Zombie Ninja Pro-Am is a video game based on the Adult Swim animated television series, Aqua Teen Hunger Force. It is a hybrid kart racing/fighting/golf game that takes place on several New Jersey golf courses. It was released for the PlayStation 2 in North America on November 5, 2007, in Australia on November 15, and in Europe on November 16. The game features all of the actors on the show at that time and includes four full episodes of Aqua Teen Hunger Force. ESPN sportscaster Scott Van Pelt provides commentary for the game.

Gameplay 
The golf segment of the game features nine holes. The first few holes are located on Jersey Pines golf course and are based on locations within the show, such as the tar pits, the Moon, Hell, and a fantasy level that Meatwad creates with Osirus's t-shirt. There are also three levels where the Aqua Teens race against the Frat Aliens giving the segment a total of 12 levels.

After teeing off, Master Shake or Frylock can be controlled as they fight their way to the balls' resting place. They face several foes, such as Carl's giant crabs, the brownie monsters, Turkitron, and the Mooninites. When the Aqua Teens reach the green they must defeat that hole's boss before they can putt.

In the golf segment's racing levels, the trio race their golf cart through the course they just played, shooting Frat Aliens with a bazooka, collecting speed boosts, and passing check points toward the goal of completing three laps to move on to the next level.

There are Easter eggs on each level for both the golf and racing sections. The Aqua Teens can collect cameos and pieces of the Broodwich to unlock a special Broodwich battle video.

Cast 
 Dana Snyder as Master Shake
 Carey Means as Frylock
 Dave Willis as Carl Brutananadilewski, Meatwad, Ignignokt
 Matt Maiellaro as Err, Cybernetic Ghost Of Christmas Past From The Future
 Andy Merrill as Oglethorpe
 Mike Schatz as Emory
 Patton Oswalt as D.P., Skeeter
 mc chris as MC Pee Pants
 Neil Peart as Neil
 Scott Van Pelt

DVD release 
Several cutscenes of the game were made available as a special feature on the volume 6 DVD.

Reception 

The game was met with negative reception upon release; GameRankings gave it a score of 42.06%, while Metacritic gave it 37 out of 100.

Sam Bishop of IGN gave the game a score of 5 out of 10, writing: "It can be a hilarious waste of time (Meatwad's caddy pep talk was brilliant), but a waste none the less." Alex Navarro of GameSpot gave it a score of 3.5 out of 10, writing: "Just because a game seemingly aims to be bad on purpose doesn't make it any less of a bad game." However, even among negative reviews, the game's inclusion of ESPN sportscaster Scott Van Pelt was singled out for praise.

See also 
 Ninja Golf
 Zany Golf

References

External links 
 

2007 video games
Zombie Ninja Pro-Am
Golf video games
Fighting games
Kart racing video games
PlayStation 2 games
PlayStation 2-only games
Racing video games
Adult Swim games
Video games based on animated television series
Video games developed in the United States
Video games with cel-shaded animation
Video games scored by Andrew Sega
Video games set in New Jersey
Multiplayer and single-player video games